Auguste Allongé (19 March 1833, Paris - 4 July 1898, Bourron-Marlotte) was a French painter, illustrator and engraver.

Biography 
He enrolled at the École nationale supérieure des beaux-arts in 1852, where he studied with Léon Cogniet and Louis Joseph César Ducornet. He was awarded a medal there in 1853. After graduating, he chose to specialize in landscapes and worked as a drawing teacher.

In 1873, he published a treatise on the art of drawing in charcoal (Le Fusain), which has been translated into several languages. It was reprinted in 1891 and 1907. His approach was novel, in that charcoal was normally used only for preliminary sketching, but he suggested techniques by which it could be polished into finished works with a special quality of their own.

He provided illustrations for Les promenades de Paris, by Jules Claretie, and La Forêt de Fontainebleau, by Charles Blanc. His students included Jean-Louis Forain and Albert Rigolot.

A street in Bourron-Marlotte has been named after him.

References

Further reading 
 Jules Martin, Nos peintres et sculpteurs, graveurs, dessinateurs, Flammarion, 1897

External links 

 More works by Allongé @ ArtNet

1833 births
1898 deaths
19th-century French painters
French landscape painters
Painters from Paris